Nationality words link to articles with information on the nation's poetry or literature (for instance, Irish or France).

Events
 December – Robert Burns writes his version of the Scots poem Auld Lang Syne.

Works published in English

United Kingdom
This year three works of poetry, all written by women (the Falconars, More and Yearsley), condemn slavery; while Samuel Pratt is an early advocate of animal rights:
 Henry Cary, Sonnets and Odes, the author turns 16 years old this year
 William Collins, Ode on the Popular Superstitions of the Highlands of Scotland
 William Crowe, Lewesdon Hill, published anonymously
 Maria Falconar and Harriet Falconar:
 Poems
 Poems on Slavery
 James Hurdis, The Village Curate
 Robert Merry, writing under the pen name "Della Crusca", Diversity
 Hannah More, Slavery: A Poem
 "Peter Pindar", see John Wolcot, below
 Samuel Jackson Pratt, Sympathy
 William Whitehead, Poems by William Whitehead, published posthumously, edited by William Mason (see also Plays and Poems 1774)
 John Wolcot, writing under the pen name "Peter Pindar", Tales and Fables
 Ann Yearsley, A Poem on the Inhumanity of the Slave Trade

United States
 Timothy Dwight, published anonymously, "The Triumph of Infidelity: A Poem", satire in heroic couplets; supports Calvinism and attacks Voltaire, David Hume, Joseph Priestley and their followers
 Philip Freneau, Miscellaneous Works of Mr. Philip Freneau, Containing His Essays and Additional Poems
 Francis Hopkinson:
 An Ode, in honor of the Adoption of the U.S. Constitution
 Seven Songs, for the Harpsichord or Forte-Piano
 Peter Markoe:
 "The Times", satire on prominent Philadelphia society people
 "The Storm", attributed to Markoe
 William Roscoe, The Wrongs of Africa: A Poem
 Susanna Rowson:
Poems on Various Subjects
 A Trip to Parnassus

Works published in other languages
 Basilio da Gama, Relação abreviada da República e Lenitivo da saudade; Brazil
 Joseph Quesnel, Colas et Colinette, a comedy in verse, French language, published in Quebec, Canada

Births
Death years link to the corresponding "[year] in poetry" article:
 January 22 – Lord Byron (died 1824), English poet and leading figure in Romanticism
 March 10 – Joseph von Eichendorff (died 1857), German poet and novelist
 May 16 – Friedrich Rückert (died 1866), German poet, translator and professor of Oriental languages
 June (day unknown) – Eliza Townsend (died 1854), American poet who published anonymously
 c. October 14 – Robert Millhouse (died 1839), English weaver poet
 October 24 – Sarah Josepha Hale (died 1879), American writer, influential editor, author of nursery rhymes, including "Mary Had a Little Lamb"
 December 6 – Richard H. Barham ("Thomas Ingoldsby") (died 1845), English poet, humorist and priest

Deaths
Birth years link to the corresponding "[year] in poetry" article:
 March 29 – Charles Wesley (born 1707), English Methodist clergyman and hymn writer
 June 12 – Johann Andreas Cramer (born 1723), German poet, writer and theologian
 July 5 – Mather Byles, (born 1707), English Colonial American clergyman and poet
 July 31 – Thomas Russell (born 1762), English poet whose Sonnets and Miscellaneous Poems are posthumously published in 1789
 October 13 – Robert Nugent, 1st Earl Nugent (born 1709), Irish poet and politician
 October 28 – William Julius Mickle (born 1734), Scottish-born poet
 Giulio Variboba (born 1725), Arbëresh poet

See also

Poetry

Notes

18th-century poetry
Poetry